Ndesha is a commune of the city of Kananga in the Democratic Republic of the Congo.

Kananga
Democratic Republic of Congo geography articles needing translation from French Wikipedia
Communes of the Democratic Republic of the Congo